The Best of Ultravox is the seventh compilation by Ultravox, released on EMI Gold records, in 2003, being one of the more recent compilation albums of the band. The songs of the disc are from the success era of the band, in the 1980s, while Midge Ure was the singer.

Track listing
"Sleepwalk"
"Waiting"
"Passing Strangers"
"Vienna"
"Passionate Reply"
"The Voice"
"Hymn"
"Monument"
"We Came to Dance"
"Dancing with Tears in My Eyes"
"Reap the Wild Wind"
"Love's Great Adventure" (Live)
"White China"
"All Fall Down"
"Dreams?"
"All in One Day"

Personnel
Midge Ure
Billy Currie
Chris Cross
Warren Cann
Mark Brzezicki

References

2003 greatest hits albums
Ultravox compilation albums